The 2005 season was Santos Futebol Clube's ninety-third season in existence and the club's forty-sixth consecutive season in the top flight of Brazilian football.

In July, Spanish giants Real Madrid signed Robinho by agreeing to pay a fee equal to 60 percent of the buyout clause in his contract belonging to Santos (€24). After the sold, the club didn't kept the great results of the last years, and they ended in the 10th position in Campeonato Brasileiro.

Players

Squad information

Appearances and goals

Transfers

In

Out

Competitions

Overview
{| class="wikitable" style="font-size:95%; text-align:center"
!Competition!!Started round!!Final position / round!!First match!!Last match
|- bgcolor="#EEEEEE"
| Campeonato Brasileiro||First stage||10th||24 April||4 December
|- 
| Campeonato Paulista||First stage||3rd||20 January||14 April
|- bgcolor="#EEEEEE"
| Copa Libertadores||Group stage||Quarterfinals||16 February||15 June
|- bgcolor="#FFFFFF"
| Copa Sudamericana||First stage||First stage||17 August||31 August
|- bgcolor="#EEEEEE"

Detailed overall summary

Campeonato Brasileiro

League table

Results summary

Results by round

Matches

Campeonato Paulista

League table

Results summary

Matches

Copa Libertadores

Group stage

Knockout stage

Round of 16

Quarter-finals

Copa Sudamericana

First round

References

External links
Official Site

2005
Santos F.C.